Akasha is a Sanskrit word referring to the Vedic concept of the aether or space.

Akasha, Akasa, Akash, Aakash or Akaash may also refer to:

Arts and entertainment

Fictional characters
 Akasha (comics), a character in the Marvel Universe
 Akasha (The Vampire Chronicles), a character in Anne Rice's novels (and screen adaptions)

Film
 Aakash (film), a 2005 Indian Kannada language action drama film 
 Akasha (2018 film), a 2018 Sudanese comedy film

Music
 Akasha (album), a 1995 album by Bill Laswell 
 Akasha (band), a UK-based electronic music duo
 Akasa (band), a London-based pop band

Religion
 Ākāśa (Jainism), space in Jain cosmology
 Akash Bhairav, a Hindu deity, particularly worshipped in Nepal

Technology
 Akash (missile), an Indian medium-range mobile surface-to-air missile defense system
 Aakash (tablet), an Android-based tablet computer
 SS Akasha, a British steamship

People
Akaash Bhatia, British featherweight professional boxer
 Akasha Lawrence-Spence, American politician
 Akasa Singh, singer and performer

Weather
 Cyclone Akash, the first named tropical cyclone of the 2007 North Indian Ocean cyclone season

See also
 Akashic Books, a Brooklyn-based independent publisher
 Akashic records (disambiguation)
 Akasa (disambiguation)
 Akash (disambiguation)
 Aakash (disambiguation)
 Akasaka (disambiguation)